Cal Poly may refer to:

California Polytechnic State University, San Luis Obispo
California State Polytechnic University, Humboldt
California State Polytechnic University, Pomona

See also
 Cal Poly athletics (disambiguation)
 Cal Poly College of Architecture and Environmental Design (disambiguation)
 Cal Poly College of Engineering (disambiguation)
 Cal Poly College of Environmental Design (disambiguation)